Amanita orientigemmata, is a species of agaric fungus in the family Amanitaceae native to northeastern, northwestern and southern China, India and Japan, first described by Zhu L. Yang & Yoshimichi Doi in 1999.

Description 
It is characterized by its yellowish to yellow pileus with white or dirty-white volval remnants that are felted to patchy, sometimes pyramidal. Its annulus is fragile and fugacious;  sometimes volval remnants remain on the stipe base. Basidiospores are broadly ellipsoid, clamps exist as well. It has been involved in at least one non-lethal case of psycho-neurological poisoning in China.

References

External links 
 

orientigemmata
Fungi of Asia
Fungi described in 1999